Edith May Farr (1864-1956) was an American botanist noted for her study of Rocky Mountain and Canadian flora. Originally from Philadelphia, she was active collecting plants in the Selkirk Range and in the southern Canadian Rockies. In 1904, she collected specimens for the University of Pennsylvania in the Rocky Mountains with Mary Schäffer Warren and Olive S. Day.

Publications

References

1864 births
1956 deaths
American women botanists
American botanists